Cyril IX Moghabghab (October 29, 1855 in Ain Zhalta, Ottoman Syria – September 8, 1947 in Alexandria, Egypt) served as Patriarch of Antioch and All the East, and Alexandria and Jerusalem of the Melkite Greek Catholic Church from 1925 to 1947.

Life
Patriarch Cyril was born in Ain Zhalta, Lebanon on October 29, 1855. He  was ordained a priest on March 27, 1883. Later, on April 23, 1899, he was elected eparch of Zahlé, Lebanon, confirmed on May 20, 1899 and consecrated eparch on May 28 of the same year by patriarch Peter IV Geraigiry. He was one of the first Melkite bishops to visit the Americas when, in 1904, he came to Brazil. He succeeded Demetrius I Qadi as patriarch of the Melkite Greek Catholic Church on December 8, 1925 and the Pope accepted his request for ecclesiastical communion on June 21, 1926. He also served as the spiritual protector of international ecumenical Military and Hospitaller Order of St. Lazarus of Jerusalem.

Patriarch Cyril died on September 8, 1947, and was succeeded by Maximos IV Sayegh.

Co-consecrator of Melkite Eparchs

During his tenure as patriarch he was co-consecrator of the following eparchs:

Dionysius Kfoury, BS - Auxiliary bishop of Antioch and Titular bishop of Tarsus dei Greco-Melkiti
Eftimios Youakim, BS - Eparch of Zahle and Furzol
Gabriel Nabaa, BS - Eparch of Sidon
Agapios Salomon Naoum, BS - Archbishop of Tyre 
Maximos V Hakim - Eparch of Akka.

Distinctions
 Order of Saint Lazarus (statuted 1910)

See also
Melkite Greek Catholic Patriarchate of Antioch and All the East
Melkite Greek Catholic Church

Notes

External links
Melkite Greek Catholic Patriarchate of Antioch, Alexandria and Jerusalem
L'Église Melkite/The Melkite Church.
Melkite Catholic Web Ring.
Official Website of the Melkite Church in the US.
Melkite Ambassadors Young Adult Website.
gcatholic.org
geni.com

1855 births
1947 deaths
Order of Saint Lazarus
Commandeurs of the Légion d'honneur
Melkite Greek Catholic Patriarchs of Antioch
Lebanese Melkite Greek Catholics
People from Chouf District
Eastern Catholic bishops in Syria